A leadership spill of the Australian Labor Party (ALP), then the opposition party in the Parliament of Australia, was held on 16 July 1982. Shadow Minister for Industrial Relations, Employment and Youth Bob Hawke unsuccessfully challenged ALP leader Bill Hayden, with Hayden winning 42 votes to 37.

Background
Despite halving Malcolm Fraser's majority at 1980 election, Bill Hayden position as leader was threatened by the entry into Parliament of the popular former President of the ACTU Bob Hawke.

In order to quell speculation over his position Hayden called a leadership spill on 16 July 1982

The day before the ballot, the leader of Labor Right faction Shadow Minister for Resources and Energy Paul Keating switched his support from Hayden to Hawke stating that "I believe that the best interests of the Labor Party and the millions of Australians who deserve and need a Labor victory and the end of Fraserism, will be best served by Bob Hawke now becoming leader." This prompted Hayden supporter Graeme Campbell to state that Keating might have made "the biggest political mistake of his life".

Candidates
 Bob Hawke, Shadow Minister for Industrial Relations, Employment, Youth Affairs, Member for Wills
 Bill Hayden, incumbent Leader, Member for Oxley

Results
The following table gives the ballot results:

Aftermath
After the closeness of the result Hayden said he would "hose down" the left- and rightwing factions of the ALP, however Hawke began to agitate more seriously behind the scenes for a change in leadership.

Hayden was further weakened after Labor's unexpectedly poor performance at a by-election in December 1982 for the Victorian seat of Flinders, which prompted Party power-brokers, such as Graham Richardson and Barrie Unsworth to openly switched their allegiance to Hawke.

Ultimately he resigned in February 1983 and Hawke was elected unopposed.

References

Australian Labor Party leadership spills
July 1982 events in Australia
1982 elections in Australia
Bob Hawke
Australian Labor Party leadership spill